The Bill Hall Trail is a hiking trail in Grand Canyon National Park, located in the U.S. state of Arizona.

Access
When roads are dry the trailhead can be accessed by a passenger car.

Description
From the dirt parking lot at the trailhead, the trail heads west and dips below the rim into the park.  The trail makes several short, steep switchbacks during its descent through the upper canyon rock layers.  In the Coconino Sandstone, the trail is at its steepest.  There are numerous boulders, some very large, that require care to detour around or climb over.  Some portions of this descent may require lowering of backpacks prior to downclimbing.

After  of steep descent, the trail levels off along the Esplanade Sandstone until the junction with the Thunder River Trail.  This junction marks the lower terminus of the trail.

The trail is named for Bill Hall who was a seasonal park ranger on the North Rim who was killed in the line of duty (automobile accident) in 
1979.

See also
 The Grand Canyon
 List of trails in Grand Canyon National Park

References

External links

 Grand Canyon National Park, Official site
 https://travelvagrants.com/bill-hall-trail/ Bill Hall trails]

Hiking trails in Grand Canyon National Park
Grand Canyon, North Rim

Grand Canyon, North Rim (west)